Ashley Mulgrave Gould (October 8, 1859 – May 20, 1921) was an Associate Justice of the Supreme Court of the District of Columbia.

Education and career

Born in Lower Horton, (now Wolfville), Nova Scotia, British America (now Canada), Gould received an Artium Baccalaureus degree from Amherst College in 1881 and a Bachelor of Laws from Georgetown Law in 1884. He was a member of the Maryland House of Delegates in 1898, and was the United States Attorney for the District of Columbia from 1901 to 1902. He began teaching as a professor of law at Georgetown University in 1901.

Federal judicial service

Gould was nominated by President Theodore Roosevelt on December 2, 1902, to an Associate Justice seat on the Supreme Court of the District of Columbia (now the United States District Court for the District of Columbia) vacated by Associate Justice Andrew Coyle Bradley. He was confirmed by the United States Senate on December 8, 1902, and received his commission the same day. His service terminated on May 20, 1921, due to his death.

References

Sources
 

1859 births
1921 deaths
Members of the Maryland House of Delegates
United States Attorneys for the District of Columbia
Judges of the United States District Court for the District of Columbia
United States district court judges appointed by Theodore Roosevelt
20th-century American judges